"Atlantis" is a song written and performed by Scottish singer-songwriter Donovan. It was released as a single in 1968 and became a worldwide success; becoming a  1 hit in the Netherlands and in Switzerland in 1969, No. 2 in Germany and South Africa, No. 12 in Canada, and No. 4 in Austria. In the United States, where it served as the B-side to "To Susan on the West Coast, Waiting", it reached No. 7, whilst in the singer's native country the single managed only a modest No. 23 placing.

In 2001, Donovan and German pop band No Angels re-recorded the track for the closing credits of the Walt Disney Feature Animation picture Atlantis: The Lost Empire (2001). Included on a concomitant album for the German-speaking music market, it was once more released as a single and re-entered the top five in Austria and Germany.

Original by Donovan

Theme
The introduction of song is a quiet monologue spoken over the song's repeated musical melody, telling of the mythological antediluvian civilization of Atlantis. The second half of the song is more energetic, with Donovan singing of finding his true love in Atlantis. The theme is common for the 1960s: fanciful mythology as a symbol of the counterculture movement, with the hope that true love will be found if Atlantis can be rediscovered.

Paul McCartney was rumored to have sung backing vocals for the song. However, Donovan said in a 2008 interview with Goldmine Magazine that McCartney was not involved in the recording sessions.

Release and reception
Contract disputes at the time caused a complicated series of different releases in the United Kingdom and United States. It was originally released in the UK as a single with "I Love My Shirt" as the B-side. In 1969 it was released in the US on the album Barabajagal. The LP was not released in the UK, however, and "Atlantis" was next released in the US as the B-side to "To Susan on the West Coast Waiting".

The song was not deemed likely to be a hit in the US because of its length and the fact that the first third of the song is spoken prose and therefore not "radio-friendly". It was for this reason that, despite its success in Europe, "Atlantis" was demoted to B-side status. However, the record company A&R executives were proved wrong when the popularity of "Atlantis" far surpassed that of its A-side.  The song was quite successful, reaching #7 on the Billboard charts, and the song itself became an anthem of the hippie movement. The song's most prominent usage was in the 1990 mob movie GoodFellas where Tommy DeVito (based on Tommy DeSimone) and Jimmy Conway (based on Jimmy Burke) are beating up Billy Batts at a bar after he insulted the former.

In 2000, Donovan did a parody version for his cameo in the Futurama episode 'The Deep South', in which he describes the lost city of Atlanta.

Charts

Georg Danzer version

In 1984, Austrian musician Georg Danzer published a German-language version of the song, which has remained musically faithful to the original. First published on the album Menschliche Wärme, it appeared in the later course on the compilations Greenpeace, Hit Barometer and Überblicke. In Austria, it became a top 20 hit.

Track listings
7-inch single
 Atlantis - 4:25	
 Die Türken - 4:55

Charts

Feller version

In 1999, German actor Thorsten Feller covered the song under the pseudonym Feller. The cover is included on the compilations Chartmix 5 and Top 13 (99) 20 Top Hits aus den internationalen Charts 5/99.

Track listings
CD single
 "Atlantis" (radio edit) - 3:44	
 "Atlantis" (acoustic edit) - 3:50

No Angels version

Production and recording
In the late 1990s, Walt Disney Feature Animation started production on Atlantis: The Lost Empire, an animated science fiction/action film, based on the Atlantis saga. Interested in slipping his 1968 version into the film soundtrack, Donovan immediately opened negotiations with the studios; however Disney was barely interested in the song and plans eventually fell through. By 2000, Disney had committed German producer Leslie Mándoki to produce a concomitant album for the German-speaking music markets, entitled Stars Inspired by Atlantis. After stumbling over the original song, Mándoki approached Donovan by phone, describing him his idea of a collaboration with German newcomers No Angels, with whom Mándoki had previously worked on their debut Elle'ments (2001), and a few days later Donovan and the band met at the Lake Starnberg to start recording.

Release and reception
"Atlantis" served as the band's fourth single along with "When the Angels Sing", a midtempo ballad from their debut album Elle'ments (2001). Physical CD singles of the double-A single were released on 19 November 2001 by Cheyenne Records. The maxi single includes the duet version, the Submarine Mix of "Atlantis" and three new remixes "When the Angels Sing".

Upon its release, "When the Angels Sing"/"Atlantis" debuted at No. 5 on the German Singles Chart in the week of 3 December 2001. It spent six weeks within the top 10 and fell out of the chart in the 14th weeks, becoming the 79th highest-selling single of 2001 in Germany. In Austria, the double-A single debuted at No. 10 on the Ö3 Austria Top 40. It peaked at No. 5 in its third week and spent four more weeks within the top 10, leaving the top 75 after 14 weeks. In Switzerland, "When the Angels Sing"/"Atlantis" entered the Swiss Hitparade at No. 56 in the week of 2 December. It reached its peak, No. 16, in its second week, becoming the band's first single to miss the top 10. It fell out of the top 100 after twelve weeks on the chart.

Music video
The single's music video was directed by Hannes Rossacher for DoRo Productions and shot in Berlin, Germany in late 2001. It shows Donovan and the band in a recording studio accented by underwater settings, backdrops, and scenes inspired by the animated movie.

Track listings

Credits and personnel
Credits adapted from the liner notes of Elle'ments.

 Nadja Benaissa – vocals
 Laszlo Bencker – keyboards, bass
 Lucy Diakovska – vocals 
 Pit Floss – additional engineering
 Felix Knöchel – assistant engineer
 George Kopecsni  – acoustic guitar
 Leslie Mándoki – production, drums, percussion

 Sandy Mölling – vocals 
 Vanessa Petruo – vocals
 Mike "Spike" Streefkerk – mixing
 Jessica Wahls – vocals 
 Peter Wölpe – guitar
 Stefan Zeh – additional engineering

Charts

Weekly charts

Year-end charts

Certifications

References

External links
 Mistakes in Donovan's Atlantis

Songs about Atlantis
Spoken word
1968 songs
1968 singles
1969 singles
1984 singles
1999 singles
2001 singles
Atlantis: The Lost Empire
Donovan songs
No Angels songs
Number-one singles in Switzerland
Songs written by Donovan
Song recordings produced by Mickie Most
Disney songs